Butts County is a county located in the central part of the U.S. state of Georgia. As of the 2020 census, the population was 25,434, up from 23,655 in 2010. The county seat is Jackson. The county was created on December 24, 1825.

Butts County is included in the Atlanta-Sandy Springs-Roswell, GA Metropolitan Statistical Area.

In 2010, the center of population of Georgia was located in the northeastern portion of the county.

History 
Butts County was formed on December 24, 1825, as the sixty-fourth county in Georgia from portions of Henry County and Monroe County.  It was named by the Georgia General Assembly in honor of Samuel Butts, an officer who was killed in the Creek War in 1814. A year later, Jackson was created as the first city in the new county and became the county seat. Other towns followed, including Indian Springs (1837); Flovilla (1883); Jenkinsburg (1889); and Pepperton (1897). Indian Springs later disincorporated and Pepperton was merged with Jackson in 1966, leaving just three incorporated cities in Butts County. In recent years, Indian Springs has again become a tourist destination including many historic sites, shops, eating establishment and the famous Indian Springs Hotel as its centerpiece.

Much of Butts County and its cities were destroyed by the army of General William T. Sherman in its March to the Sea during the American Civil War. Butts County struggled for decades afterwards to become economically stable again. The arrival of the first railroad train on May 5, 1882, started the resurgence and growth followed. In 1898, caught up in the post-reconstruction fervor that had infected most Georgia counties, Butts County erected a monumental courthouse designed by Bruce & Morgan. This building was used as a courthouse until 2019; following renovations, it is now a museum and visitor's center. The construction of the Lloyd Shoals dam in 1910 created Jackson Lake, a recreational lake located primarily in Butts County.

Progress milestones in Butts County include the first telephones in 1884; first waterworks in 1905; electric lights on February 19, 1907; and traffic lights in 1926.

In 2007, Butts County, along with the city of Flovilla were both designated as Georgia Signature Communities by the Georgia Department of Community Affairs. This prestigious designation was given to a total of 12 communities in Georgia that year.

Mass Media 
Butts County has one radio station: WJGA FM 92.1 and one local newspaper, the Jackson Progress-Argus.
The county has gained attention in recent years as being a frequent backdrop for a number of movies and television shows. Most recently, the Netflix series Stranger Things made the Butts County city of Jackson, Georgia the backdrop of the show's fictional town of Hawkins, Indiana, turning the downtown area into a 1980s Indiana small town. In addition to the many buildings of the downtown that are visible in various scenes, the exterior of the Butts County Courthouse is featured, standing in for the Hawkins library.

The fact that Butts County serves as the filming location for key events in the show has already led fans there after just two seasons. Other shows which have filmed in the area include The Originals, a television show, and a recent remake of Endless Love by Universal Studios.

Geography 
The entirety of Butts County is located in the Upper Ocmulgee River sub-basin of the Altamaha River basin.

Major highways 

  Interstate 75
  U.S. Route 23
  State Route 16
  State Route 36
  State Route 42
  State Route 87
  State Route 401 (unsigned designation for I-75)

Adjacent counties 
 Newton County (north)
 Jasper County (east)
 Monroe County (south)
 Lamar County (southwest)
 Spalding County (west)
 Henry County (northwest)

Government and infrastructure

County government

Butts County is governed by a Board of Commissioners composed of one commissioner from each of the county's five electoral districts. The commission members serve four year, staggered terms. The Board is presided over by the Chairman, elected annually from the members of the Commission to chair the meetings of the Board. The Board employs a County Administrator, Deputy County Administrator, County Clerk and nine department managers to oversee the daily affairs of the government.

There are four Constitutional Officers and three Elected Officials who are elected at-large by the voters of the county. The Constitutional Officers include the Sheriff; Tax Commissioner; Probate Judge and Clerk of the Superior Court. Elected officials include the Magistrate Judge; Coroner and County Surveyor. Other services are provided by departments headed by appointees of the Board of Commissioners.

In 2008, a movement began to create an elected, at-large chairman position to serve as presiding officer over the Board of Commissioners. This movement lost ground in 2009 and has not been revisited.

State representation 

The Georgia Diagnostic and Classification State Prison of the Georgia Department of Corrections is a maximum security prison in unincorporated Butts County. It is home to Georgia's death row for men and Georgia's execution facility. The prison is also home to maximum security general population (non-death row).

Politics

Famous and notable places 

1821 - The Indian Springs Hotel, now a museum, was the site of the signing of the treaty that ceded all Native American land in Butts County to the government. Today it is operated as a museum and had been carefully preserved by generations of historical society members. Indian Springs State Park surrounds the hotel and is the oldest State Park in the nation.

Jackson Lake, created by the damming of the Ocmulgee River in 1911, is now a recreational venue that attracts many visitors from all over middle and North Georgia.

1929 - Fresh Air Barbecue, the oldest functioning barbecue restaurant still in its original location in Georgia, was awarded the title of Georgia's Best Barbecue in 1984.

1966 - Georgia Diagnostic and Classification State Prison, (formerly Georgia Diagnostic and Classification Center, and often shortened to Georgia Diagnostic Prison.), is the largest employer in Butts County. The prison is a maximum security prison that also houses the death row inmates. Until recent years, it was the location of the electric chair until this was replaced by lethal injection.

1978 - Dauset Trails Nature Center was founded.

Demographics

2000 census
As of the census of 2000, there were 19,522 people, 6,455 households, and 4,867 families living in the county. There were 7,380 housing units at an average density of 40 per square mile (15/km2). The racial makeup of the county was 69.22% White, 28.82% Black or African American, 0.39% Native American, 0.26% Asian, 0.02% Pacific Islander, 0.34% from other races, and 0.95% from two or more races. 1.42% of the population were Hispanic or Latino of any race.

There were 6,455 households, out of which 34.50% had children under the age of 18 living with them, 57.00% were married couples living together, 13.90% had a female householder with no husband present, and 24.60% were non-families. 20.90% of all households were made up of individuals, and 8.00% had someone living alone who was 65 years of age or older. The average household size was 2.73 and the average family size was 3.15.

In the county, the population was spread out, with 24.10% under the age of 18, 9.20% from 18 to 24, 33.00% from 25 to 44, 23.50% from 45 to 64, and 10.20% who were 65 years of age or older. The median age was 36 years. For every 100 females, there were 114.10 males. For every 100 females age 18 and over, there were 117.80 males.

The median income for a household in the county was $39,879, and the median income for a family was $44,937. Males had a median income of $33,155 versus $21,869 for females. The per capita income for the county was $17,016. About 8.60% of families and 11.50% of the population were below the poverty line, including 15.00% of those under age 18 and 16.70% of those age 65 or over.

2010 census
As of the 2010 United States Census, there were 23,655 people, 7,881 households, and 5,834 families living in the county. The racial makeup of the county was 69.9% white, 27.3% black or African American, 0.5% Asian, 0.2% American Indian, 0.7% from other races, and 1.3% from two or more races. Those of Hispanic or Latino origin made up 2.5% of the population. In terms of ancestry, 22.3% were American, 10.4% were Irish, 9.8% were English, and 6.8% were German.

Of the 7,881 households, 36.6% had children under the age of 18 living with them, 52.8% were married couples living together, 15.6% had a female householder with no husband present, 26.0% were non-families, and 21.8% of all households were made up of individuals. The average household size was 2.70 and the average family size was 3.13. The median age was 38.1 years.

The median income for a household in the county was $52,257 and the median income for a family was $59,511. Males had a median income of $38,801 versus $31,310 for females. The per capita income for the county was $20,963. About 9.0% of families and 12.4% of the population were below the poverty line, including 19.1% of those under age 18 and 10.0% of those age 65 or over.

2020 census

As of the 2020 United States census, there were 25,434 people, 8,279 households, and 5,823 families residing in the county.

Education

All parts of the county are in the Butts County School District.

Communities

Cities
 Flovilla
 Jackson
 Jenkinsburg

Unincorporated communities
 Stark
 Worthville

See also

 National Register of Historic Places listings in Butts County, Georgia
List of counties in Georgia

References

External links

 Butts County Board of Commissioners Official Site
 Butts County Historical Society 
 Butts County historical marker

 
1825 establishments in Georgia (U.S. state)
Populated places established in 1825
Georgia (U.S. state) counties
Butts